Alexandra Harbold (born March 4, 1965) is an American sprint kayaker who competed in the early to mid-1990s. Competing in two Summer Olympics, she earned her best finish of seventh in the K-4 500 m event at Barcelona in 1992.

References
Sports-Reference.com profile

1965 births
American female canoeists
Canoeists at the 1992 Summer Olympics
Canoeists at the 1996 Summer Olympics
Living people
Olympic canoeists of the United States
Pan American Games medalists in canoeing
Pan American Games gold medalists for the United States
Canoeists at the 1995 Pan American Games
Medalists at the 1995 Pan American Games
20th-century American women